River Highlands State Park is a public recreation area located on the west bank of the Connecticut River in the town of Cromwell, Connecticut. The  state park is managed by Connecticut Department of Energy and Environmental Protection.

History
The property sits at a river bend once known as "the blow hole," where whistling winds were said by sailors to speed along their ships. The hole itself, silenced by silting, was last heard sometime in the middle years of the twentieth century. The park's acreage was inherited by the family of Ulia Allegretti, who then sold it to the state in 1995. Using funds from an open space acquisition fund, the State Department of Environmental Protection paid $1,195,000 for the land. The park was opened to the public in 2001.

Activities and amenities
The park offers hiking trails and scenic river vistas. Trails are also used for mountain biking. It is one of four state parks where boaters can find primitive camping.

References

External links
River Highlands State Park Connecticut Department of Energy and Environmental Protection
River Highlands State Park Map Connecticut Department of Energy and Environmental Protection

State parks of Connecticut
Parks in Middlesex County, Connecticut
Cromwell, Connecticut
Protected areas established in 2001
2001 establishments in Connecticut